Nancy Carnevale is an Associate Professor of History at Montclair State University, and winner of a 2010 American Book Award for A New Language, A New World: Italian Immigrants in the United States, 1890-1945 (University of Illinois Press, 2009).

She graduated from Rutgers College with a BA, from University of Michigan with an MA, and from Rutgers University with a PhD in US history. Her areas of expertise include the history of immigration, race, & ethnicity in the U.S., Italian American History, and U.S. Women's History.

Works

References

Living people
Montclair State University faculty
Rutgers University alumni
University of Michigan alumni
American Book Award winners
Year of birth missing (living people)